Dailučiai is a small village in Marijampolė County, Lithuania. According to the census of 2011, it had 147 residents.

Dailučiai was established after World War I when Versnupiai manor was abolished.

Famous people
Algimantas Sakalauskas, Lithuanian folk artist and wood sculptor, was born in Dailučiai.

References

Villages in Marijampolė County